This is a list of Spanish television related events from 1962.

Events
 20 July: Roque Pro os appointed Director General of RTVE.
 3 October: TV show Ésta es su vida, debuts on TVE and becomes one of the most successful TV programs in the History of Spanish Television.
 31 December: First time Twelve Grapes are broadcast on TV.

Debuts

Television shows
 Telediario (1957- )
 Pantalla deportiva (1959-1963) 
 Fiesta brava (1959-1964) 
 Gran parada (1959-1964) 
 Teatro de familia (1959-1965) 
 Primer aplauso (1959-1966) 
 Tengo un libro en las manos (1959-1966)
 Panorama (1960-1963)
 Gran teatro (1960-1964)
 Sí o no (1961-1963)
 Amigos del martes (1961-1964) 
 Escala en hi-fi (1961-1967) 
 Tortuga perezosa, La (1961-1968)

Ending this year 
 Fila cero (1958-1962)
 Analía Gadé nos cuenta (1961-1962) 
 Gane su viaje (1961-1962) 
 Silencio, se rueda (1961-1962)

Foreign series debuts in Spain 
 Bonanza (USA)
 King of Diamonds (Rey de diamantes) (USA)
 The Adventures of William Tell (Guillermo Tell) (UK).
 The Defenders (Los Defensores) (USA)
 Checkmate (Ajedrez fatal) (USA)
 Follow the Sun (La ruta del sol) (USA)
 Markham (USA)
 Mister Ed (USA)
 Bachelor Father (Papá soltero) (USA)
 Sugarfoot (USA)
 The Loretta Young Show (El show de Loretta Young) (USA)

Births
 2 January - Carmelo Gómez, actor.
 20 February - Hilario Pino, host.
 4 March - Miriam Díaz-Aroca, actress and hostess.
 17 March - Juana Cordero, actress.
 24 March -María Bouzas, actress.
 6 April - Alejandra Grepi, actress.
 16 May - Nuria González, actress.
 19 May - Frances Ondiviela, actress.
 10 June - Fernando Olmeda, journalist.
 16 June - Carmen Hornillos, hostess.
 28 July - Pablo Carbonell, host.
 2 August - Vicky Larraz, singer and hostess.
 14 August - Pilar Torres, actress.
 24 August - Marta Valverde, hostess and actress.
 15 September - Goyo González, host.
 22 October - Pocholo Martínez Bordiú, host.
 27 November - Carlos Lozano, host.
 11 December - Mario Picazo, meteorologist and host.
 15 December - Juan y Medio, host.

See also
 1962 in Spain
 List of Spanish films of 1962

References